White Dew is a Soviet 1983 comedy film directed by Igor Dobrolyubov.

It was chosen as comedy of the year by Soviet Screen.

Plot
A small Belarusian village White Dew is becoming absorbed into a big town. In it lives an honored and respected man Fedos Khodas (Vsevolod Sanaev). He has long been a widower, and his three sons have grown up. Fedos is worried about them. Senior Andrew (Gennady Garbuk) is a solid man but too calculating. Merry Vaska (Nikolai Karachentsov) may lose his family because his wife Marousia (Galina Polskikh) was meeting with her ex-lover in his absence. Middle one – Sasha (Michael Kakshonav), went to the Kuril Islands, and for 15 years was not at home. Events unfold in the background concerning the village characters and their resettlement in the city apartments.

Cast

Lead roles
Vsevolod Sanayev – Fedos Hodas
Nikolai Karachentsov – Vasiliy (Vaska), the youngest son
Mikhail Kokshenov – Aleksander (Sashka), the middle son
Gennady Garbuk – Andrei, the eldest son
Boris Novikov – Timofei

Supporting roles
Galina Polskikh – Marousia, wife of Vasiliy
Natalya Khorokhorina – Verka, postman
Stanislav Sadalsky – Mikhail (Mishka) Kisel
Stefaniya Stanyuta – Kiselikha
Irina Egorova – Andrei's wife
Alexander Bespaly – Mikhail (Mishka)
Yury Kukharenok – Skvortsov
Yulia Kosmacheva – Galyunya
 Galina Makarova – Matrona

References

External links
 

Belarusian comedy films
1983 comedy films
Belarusfilm films
1983 films
1980s Russian-language films
Soviet comedy films